Ott Kadarik (born May 9, 1976 in Tallinn) is a notable Estonian architect.

He graduated from the Department of Architecture of the Estonian Academy of Arts in 2000.

Ott Kadarik works in the architectural office KOSMOS OÜ.

Notable works by Ott Kadarik are the central square of Rakvere, the apartment buildings in Laagri, the four apartment buildings in the Rotermanni Quarter and the apartment building in the old town of Tallinn. Ott Kadarik is a member of the Union of Estonian Architects.

Works
Apartment building on Põldma Street, 2003 (with Mihkel Tüür)
Apartment buildings in Laagri, 2003 (with Mihkel Tüür, Villem Tomiste)
Central square of Rakvere, 2004 (with Villem Tomiste, Mihkel Tüür Veronika Valk)
Duplexes on Põdrakanepi Street, 2005 (with Mihkel Tüür, Villem Tomiste)
Apartment buildings in Rotermanni Quarter, 2007 (with Mihkel Tüür, Villem Tomiste)
Apartment building in Old Town of Tallinn, 2009 (with Mihkel Tüür, Villem Tomiste)
5th Tallinn Applied Art Triennial, Main exhibition “KNOW HOW” design 2009 (with Tuuli Aule)

Competitions
1997	Ärihoone Kuressaares II prize M.Kadarik
1998	Rakvere keskosa detailplaneering I prize V.Tomiste, V.Valk
1998	Vabaduse Väljaku planeering äramainimine V.Tomiste
1999	Hugo Treffneri Gümnaasiumi juurdeehitus I prize A.Lunge
1999	Tamme staadioni tribüün	II prize M.Tüür
1999	Võru Keskväljaku ja selle Lähiümbruse detailplaneering ostupreemia V.Tomiste, V.Valk
2000	Pärnu rüütli platsi kujundus III prize R.Valner
2000	Lasnamäe spordihoone äramärkimine V.Tomiste, V.Valk
2000	Tartu sissesõidutähis I prize L.Torim
2000	Tartu Rüütli tänava kujundus I prize R.Valner
2000	Tallinna mereäärse ala planeeringuvõistlus ost R.Valner
2000	Europan 6 Viinis runner-up R.Valner, S.Vallner, K.Koov
2000	Pärnu Sütevaka kooli võimla arhitektuurivõistlus II prize M.Tüür
2000	Põlva keskosa planeeringuvõistlus ostupreemia V.Tomiste, V.Valk
2001	Urva 7 kortermaja kutsutud võistlus I prize M.Tüür
2002	Mustjõe detailplaneering I prize V.Tomiste, M.Tüür
2002	Kalevi kommivabriku ala planeering ostupreemia V.Tomiste, M.Tüür
2003	Aia tänava äri- ja kortermaja kutsutud võistlus I prize V.Tomiste, M.Tüür
2003	Tartu Emajõeäärse ala planeeringuvõistlus III prize V.Tomiste, M.Tüür
2003	Kipsala saare planeeringuvõistlus runner-up V.Tomiste, M.Tüür
2003	Linnahalli ümberehitus I-II prize V.Tomiste, M.Tüür
2003	Tartu mnt.63, Marati kvartali juurdeehitus I prize V.Tomiste, M.Tüür
2003	Marati Kvartali arhitektuurivõistlus I prize V.Tomiste, M.Tüür, P.Ulman
2003	Paadi tänava hotelli kutsutud arhitektuurivõistlus I prize V.Tomiste, M.Tüür, T.Hayashi
2003	Viimsi Koolimaja arhitektuurivõistlus ost V.Tomiste, M.Tüür
2004	Rottermanni kvartali kutsutud arhitektuurivõistlus I prize V.Tomiste, M.Tüür
2004	Tartu Fortuuna kvartali arhitektuurivõistlus III prize V.Tomiste, M.Tüür
2004	Viljandi metsakalmistu kabel	äramärgitud V.Tomiste, M.Tüür
2005	Tartu Mõisavahe hoonestuskava ideekonkurss I prize V.Tomiste, M.Tüür
2005	Tallinna Pritsumaja kvartali hoonestus, kutsutud võistlus I prize V.Tomiste, M.Tüür
2005	ERMi uue hoone arhitektuurivõistlus ostupreemia	V.Tomiste, M.Tüür
2005	Kliversala saare planeeringuvõistlus ostupreemia V.Tomiste, M.Tüür
2005	Skoone bastioni planeeringuvõistlus III prize V.Tomiste, M.Tüür, P.Ulman
2006	Kiviõli Linnaväljaku arhitektuurivõistlus ostupreemia V.Tomiste, M.Tüür, K.Kivi
2006	Maakri Kvartali arhitektuurivõistlus runner-up V.Tomiste, M.Tüür
2006	Juhkentali Kvartali kutsutud arhitektuurivõistlus I prize V.Tomiste, M.Tüür
2006	Paide Spordihalli arhitektuurivõistlus I prize V.Tomiste, M.Tüür
2006	Pärnu Jõeäärse Planeeringu ideevõistlus III prize V.Tomiste, M.Tüür
2006	TTÜ Raamatukogu arhitektuurivõistlus III prize V.Tomiste
2007	Patarei ja Lennusadama ala planeeringuvõistlus III prize V.Tomiste
2007	Paide Kutsekooli arhitektuurivõistlus I prize V.Tomiste, M.Tüür
2007	Tamsalu keskosa ruumiline planeerimine III prize V.Tomiste, M.Tüür
2007	Vabaõhumuuseumi arhitektuurivõistlus ostupreemia V.Tomiste, M.Tüür
2008	Viljandi Kultuuriakadeemia uue hoone arhitektuurivõistlus II prize
2008	Arhitektuurimuuseumi urbanistliku pargi konkurss II prize
2009	Kultuuritehase arhitektuurivõistlus III prize V.Tomiste, M.Tüür
2009	Hoolekandeküla arhitektuurivõistlus Äramärkimine V.Tomiste
2009	Tartu Füüsikahoone juurdeehituse arhitektuurivõistlus I prize V.Tomiste
2009	Tartu Füüsikahoone juurdeehituse arhitektuurivõistlus II prize V.Tomiste

References
Union Of Estonian Architects, members
Architectural Bureau KOSMOS OÜ, works
Photographic works

1976 births
Living people
Architects from Tallinn